Shahrokhabad (also Romanized as Shāhrokhābād; also known as Shūrokhābād) is a village in Yazdanabad Rural District, Yazdanabad District, Zarand County, Kerman Province, Iran. At the 2006 census, its population was 20, in 4 families.

References 

Populated places in Zarand County